The 1976 All-Big Ten Conference football team consists of American football players chosen by various organizations for All-Big Ten Conference teams for the 1976 Big Ten Conference football season.

Seven players were unanimously selected as first-team players by the Associated Press (AP): flanker Jim Smith (Michigan); running backs Scott Dierking (Purdue) and Rob Lytle (Michigan); defensive linemen Bob Brudzinski (Ohio State) and Greg Morton (Michigan); and linebackers Calvin O'Neal (Michigan) and Scott Studwell (Illinois).

The Michigan Wolverines dominated the offensive unit, taking six of eleven places on the first team selected by the Associated Press (AP), including Lytle, Smith, and quarterback Rick Leach. The Ohio State Buckeyes, on the other hand, dominated the defensive unit, taking five of the eleven places on the AP first team, including Brudzinski and linebacker Tom Cousineau.

Offensive selections

Quarterbacks

 Rick Leach, Michigan (AP-1; UPI-1)
 Tony Dungy, Minnesota (AP-2; UPI-2)

Running backs
 Scott Dierking, Purdue (AP-1; UPI-1)
 Rob Lytle, Michigan (AP-1; UPI-1)
 Pete Johnson, Ohio State (AP-2; UPI-2)
 Jeff Logan, Ohio State (AP-2; UPI-2)

Flankers

 Jim Smith, Michigan (AP-1; UPI-1)
 Kirk Gibson, Michigan State (AP-2; UPI-2)

Wide receivers
 Scott Yelvington, Northwestern (AP-1; UPI-1)
 Ron Kullas, Minnesota (AP-2)
 David Charles, Wisconsin (UPI-2)

Tight ends
 Mike Cobb, Michigan State (AP-1; UPI-1)
 Jim Moore, Ohio State (AP-2)
 Gene Johnson, Michigan (UPI-2)

Centers
 Walt Downing, Michigan (AP-1; UPI-1)
 Al Pitts, Michigan State (AP-2; UPI-2)

Guards

 Mark Donahue, Michigan (AP-1; UPI-1)
 Connie Zelencik, Purdue (AP-1; UPI-2)
 Bill Lukens, Ohio State (AP-2; UPI-1)
 Kirk Lewis, Michigan (AP-2)
 Kevin Pancratz, Illinois (UPI-2)

Tackles
 Bill Dufek, Michigan (AP-1; UPI-1)
 Chris Ward, Ohio State (AP-1; UPI-1)
 Jerry Finis, Illinois (AP-2; UPI-2)
 Tony Bruggenthies, Michigan State (AP-2)
 Mike Kenn, Michigan (UPI-2)

Defensive selections

Front five
 Aaron Brown, Ohio State (AP-1; UPI-1 [middle guard])
 Bob Brudzinski, Ohio State (AP-1; UPI-1 [def. end])
 Nick Buonomici, Ohio State (AP-1; UPI-1 [def. tackle])
 Greg Morton, Michigan (AP-1; UPI-1 [def. tackle])
 Blane Smith, Purdue (AP-1; UPI-2 [def. end])
 John Anderson, Michigan (AP-2; UPI-1 [def. end])
 Larry Bethea, Michigan State (AP-2; UPI-2 [def. tackle])
 John DiFeliciantonio, Illinois (AP-2)
 Paul Maly, Northwestern (AP-2; UPI-2 [middle guard])
 George Washington, Minnesota (AP-2)
 Otto Smith, Michigan State (UPI-2 [def. end])
 Eddie Beamon, Ohio State (UPI-2 [def. tackle])

Linebackers
 Calvin O'Neal, Michigan (AP-1; UPI-1)
 Scott Studwell, Illinois (AP-1; UPI-1)
 Tom Cousineau, Ohio State (AP-1)
 Dave Crossen, Wisconsin (AP-2)
 Steve Sanders, Indiana (AP-2)
 Ed Thompson, Ohio State (AP-2; UPI-2)
 Tom Rusk, Iowa (UPI-2)

Defensive backs
 Ray Griffin, Ohio State (AP-1; UPI-1)
 Pete Shaw, Northwestern (AP-1; UPI-1)
 Tom Hannon, Michigan State (AP-1; UPI-2)
 George Adzick, Minnesota (AP-2; UPI-1)
 Paul Beery, Purdue (AP-2; UPI-1)
 Dwight Hicks, Michigan (AP-2)
 Jim Stauner, Illinois (UPI-2)
 Jim Pickens, Michigan (UPI-2)
 Jerry Zuver, Michigan (UPI-2)

Special teams

Placekicker
 Dan Beaver, Illinois (AP-1; UPI-1)
 Bob Wood, Michigan (UPI-2)

Punter
 Tom Skladany, Ohio State (AP-1)

Key

See also
1976 College Football All-America Team

References

All-Big Ten Conference
All-Big Ten Conference football teams